The 1997 Speedway Grand Prix of Czech Republic was the first race of the 1997 Speedway Grand Prix season. It took place on 17 May in the Marketa Stadium in Prague, Czech Republic It was the first Czech Republic SGP and was won by American rider Greg Hancock. It was the second win of his career.

Starting positions draw 

The Speedway Grand Prix Commission nominated Tomas Topinka from Czech Republic as Wild Card.

Heat details

The intermediate classification

See also 
 Speedway Grand Prix
 List of Speedway Grand Prix riders

References

External links 
 FIM-live.com
 SpeedwayWorld.tv

Speedway Grand Prix of Czech Republic
C
1997